Dryadaula irinae is a moth belonging to the family Tineidae. The species was first described by Nikolaj Savenkov in 1989.

It is native to Europe.

References

Tineidae